The Arc of Life is a 2021 Taiwanese television series written by Lu Shih-Yuan and directed by Hsu Chao-Jen. The series stars Ruby Lin, Ivy Chen, Jian Man-shu, Roy Chiu and Chris Wang.
The series premiered on GTV and IQIYI on 31 January 2021.

Synopsis
An inspirational story that revolves around 3 female entrepreneurs in the age of 'Female Power, treating each other sincerely'

Cast

Main

Supporting
 Sara Yu
 Li Kwok-Chiu
 Ha Hsiao-Yuan
 Ma Kuo-Bi
 Jack Kao
 Tou Chung-hua
 Josie Leung
 Bryan Chang
 Matilda Tao
 Chang Han
 Brando Huang
 Lung Shao-hua
 Luo Shih-feng

Special guests
 Lee Li-chun as Xia Yutian (Xia Zhi's father)
 Pauline Lan as Hao Qinglang (Xia Zhi's Mother)

Soundtrack

Production
The series began filming at Taichung on February 2, 2020 and wrapped up production on June 9, 2020.

References

External links

 
 
 
 iqiyi Page
 iQIYI

Taiwanese drama television series
2021 Taiwanese television series endings
Gala Television original programming
Taiwanese television dramas based on manga
Taiwanese romance television series
Star Chinese Channel original programming